Sustainer may refer to:

 Fernandes Sustainer, a guitar accessory
 God the Sustainer, the concept of a God who sustains and upholds everything in existence

See also

 Sustain (disambiguation)
 Sustainability
 Sustenance
 The Sustainer - House journal of the Royal Logistic Corps